First Presbyterian Church historic Presbyterian Church located at Niagara Falls, Niagara County, New York. The original section was built in 1849, with additions and modifications made in 1879, 1903–1904, and 1921. The sanctuary was renovated in 1957. It is a Gothic Revival style, "L"-shaped, stone church.  The church features a three-story crenellated bell tower and round arched windows and openings.  The congregation was established in 1824.

It was listed on the National Register of Historic Places in 2014.

References

Presbyterian churches in New York (state)
Churches on the National Register of Historic Places in New York (state)
Gothic Revival architecture in New York (state)
Churches completed in 1849
19th-century Presbyterian church buildings in the United States
1824 establishments in New York (state)
Churches in Niagara Falls, New York
National Register of Historic Places in Niagara County, New York